Deh Pirangan-e Bala (also Romanized as Deh Pīrangān-e Bālā) is a village in Mosaferabad Rural District, Rudkhaneh District, Rudan County, Hormozgan Province, Iran. As of the 2006 census, its population was 91, in 23 families.

References 

Populated places in Rudan County